The 2019 New York City ePrix (formally the 2019 New York City E-Prix) were a pair of ePrix which were the final two races of the 2018–19 Formula E season held in Brooklyn, New York around the Brooklyn Street Circuit. This was the third running of the New York City ePrix.

Heading into the weekend it was Jean-Éric Vergne who led the drivers championship by 32 points. He managed to maintain his lead to take the championship after the second race, thus becoming the first driver to win multiple Formula E Drivers' Championship titles.

Classification

Race one

Qualifying 

Notes:
  – Edoardo Mortara received a five-place grid drop for causing a collision in the previous race and two additional penalty points.
  – Jérôme d'Ambrosio did not fulfill the qualifying criteria by not setting a (competitive) lap time. The Stewards permitted d'Ambrosio to start the race.

Race

Notes:
  – Sam Bird received a ten-second time penalty after causing a collision.
  – Jérôme d'Ambrosio received a five-second time penalty after forcing another driver off-track.
  – Pole position.
  – Fastest lap.

Race two

Qualifying 

Notes:
  – Tom Dillmann received a 3-place grid penalty for impeeding Gary Paffett during his flying lap.
  – Alex Lynn received a 20-place grid penalty for changing E-Motor (MGU). Since Lynn qualified 21st, he was unable to take the full grid drop, resulting in that penalty being replaced by a drive-through penalty.
  – Felipe Massa did not fulfill the qualifying criteria by not setting a flying lap time. The Stewards permitted Massa to start the race.

Race

Notes:
  – Both Panasonic Jaguar Racing drivers (Lynn and Evans) received a drive through penalty converted into a 22-second time penalty for exceeding the maximum battery temperature.
  – Mitch Evans received a 10-second stop and go penalty converted into a 37-second time penalty for causing a collision with Lucas di Grassi.
  – André Lotterer received a 22-second time penalty for causing a dangerous collision with José María López and three additional penalty points.
  – Pole position.
  – Fastest lap.

References 

|- style="text-align:center"
|width="35%"|Previous race:2019 Swiss ePrix
|width="30%"|FIA Formula E Championship2018–19 season
|width="35%"|Next race:2019 Ad Diriyah ePrix
|- style="text-align:center"
|width="35%"|Previous race:2018 New York City ePrix
|width="30%"|New York City ePrix
|width="35%"|Next race:TBD
|- style="text-align:center"

New York City ePrix
New York City ePrix
New York City ePrix
New York City ePrix
New York City ePrix